The 1952 Paris–Nice was the tenth edition of the Paris–Nice cycle race and was held from 25 March to 30 March 1952. The race started in Paris and finished in Nice. The race was won by Louison Bobet.

General classification

References

1952
1952 in road cycling
1952 in French sport
March 1952 sports events in Europe